Edward John McCoy  (23 February 1925 – 17 January 2018), generally known as Ted McCoy, was a New Zealand architect whose practice was based in Dunedin. He designed the sanctuary of St Paul's Cathedral (completed 1970), and the Richardson (formerly Hocken) Building of the University of Otago (completed 1979), among many others. In 1950, he established McCoy and Wixon Architects, joined in partnership by Peter Wixon in 1967.

Biography
Born on 23 February 1925, McCoy studied architecture at the University of Auckland, graduating in 1949. He moved back to his home city of Dunedin the following year, setting up an architectural practice in the city. His first major design was for the Dominican Order's Aquinas Hall, in the north of the city, (now an Otago University hall of residence, Aquinas College). The design won a Gold Medal as design of the year from the New Zealand Institute of Architects.

McCoy and his wife Nola had 13 children, two sons and 11 daughters, four of whom followed him into architectural design. He died at his home in Dunedin on 17 January 2018, aged 92.

Works

 Otago Boys' High School development
 1950 Aquinas College
 1970 St Paul's Cathedral sanctuary
 1973 Archway Lecture Theatre Complex
 1979 Richardson Building, formerly known as the Hocken Building
 1986 Castle Lecture Theatre Complex
 1969 University College
 1983 Broadwater (private home), Doctors Point, Waitati
 1991, 1999 East Taieri Presbyterian Church administrative and fellowship centre at the rear of the building.
 2000 Otago Museum atrium

Recognition
 2002 New Zealand Institute of Architects' gold medal for lifetime achievement in architecture.
 2005 Officer of the New Zealand Order of Merit, for services to architecture and architectural heritage
 2008 Honorary doctor of laws degree from the University of Otago
 2009 Dunedin Heritage Trust Bluestone Award

Legacy
In 2016, the New Zealand Institute of Architects inaugurated the Ted McCoy Award, to be presented annually, for design of education facilities.

McCoy's career and buildings are recorded in the 2007 book, A Southern Architecture: The work of Ted McCoy, written by McCoy and published by Otago University Press.

References

External links
 McCoy and Wixon Architects
 2008 interview with McCoy

1925 births
2018 deaths
Architects from Dunedin
Officers of the New Zealand Order of Merit
Recipients of the NZIA Gold Medal
University of Auckland alumni
Brutalist architects